A track checker is a small railway carriage used in the United States and Ireland to audit the gauge and integrity of railway tracks.  The first track checkers were simply people that walked the tracks, making sure that the tracks were not damaged and that the switches were working.  These people were also called track walkers.  Track walkers are famously still employed by the MTA maintaining the New York City subway lines.

A modern track checker, however, is a small carriage on wheels, about the same size as a Smart Car, and can be automated or driven by one engineer, who is also known as a "Track checker."

Maintenance of way equipment